George Augustus North, 3rd Earl of Guilford, FRS (11 September 1757 – 20 April 1802), known as The Honourable George North until 1790 and as Lord North from 1790 to 1792, was a British politician.

Early life

Guilford was the eldest son of Frederick North, 2nd Earl of Guilford (commonly known as Lord North) who served as Prime Minister of Great Britain from 1770 to 1782, and his wife Anne (née Speke), Ranger of Bushy Park from 1771 to 1797. Among his siblings were Francis North (later the 4th Earl), Catherine Anne North (wife of Sylvester Douglas, 1st Baron Glenbervie), Lady Charlotte North (wife of Lt.-Col. John Lindsay, a son of the 5th Earl of Balcarres), Frederick North (later the 5th Earl), and Lady Anne North (wife of John Baker-Holroyd, 1st Earl of Sheffield).

His paternal grandfather was Francis North, 1st Earl of Guilford. His mother was the daughter and heiress of George Speke of White Lackington, by his third wife Anne Peer-Williams (a daughter of William Peer-Williams).

North was educated at Trinity College, Oxford, matriculating in 1774, graduating with a nobleman's M.A. in 1777.

Career
He was elected to the House of Commons for Harwich in 1778, a seat he held until 1784, and then represented Wootton Bassett from 1784 to 1790, Petersfield in 1790 and Banbury from 1790 to 1792.

In the latter year, he succeeded his father in the earldom and entered the House of Lords. He was a supporter of his father's policies during the American War of Independence which came under attack from all sides. He was given the honorary post of Captain of Deal Castle in 1786, which he held until his death. He was elected a Fellow of the Royal Society in 1782.

Personal life
Lord Guilford married firstly Lady Maria Frances Mary Hobart, daughter of George Hobart, 3rd Earl of Buckinghamshire, on 24 September 1785. Before her death on 23 April 1794, they were the parents of one child, a daughter:

 Lady Maria North (1793–1841), who married, as his first wife, John Crichton-Stuart, 2nd Marquess of Bute, in 1818.

After Lady Maria's death, North remarried on 28 February 1796 to Susan, daughter of Thomas Coutts, founder of the banking house of Coutts & Co. with his brother, James Coutts, MP for Edinburgh. Together, they were the parents of:

 Lady Susan North (1797–1884), later suo jure Baroness North.
 Lady Georgiana North (d. 1835), who died unmarried.

It was while courting his second wife that Guilford sustained a spinal injury in a fall from his horse and died from a lingering illness that resulted in April 1802, aged 44. He was buried at Wroxton in Oxfordshire. On his death his junior title of Baron North fell into abeyance between his daughters while he was succeeded in the earldom by his younger brother, Francis.

Guilford's son-in-law, the Marquess of Bute, brought a petition to the House of Lords to resolve the partition of the late Earl's estate between his widow and his daughters. This was finally enacted by William IV in October 1831. The Countess of Guilford died in 1837.

Notes

References

Kidd, Charles, Williamson, David (editors). Debrett's Peerage and Baronetage (1990 edition). New York: St Martin's Press, 1990.

1757 births
1802 deaths
18th-century English nobility
19th-century English nobility
Earls of Guilford
Children of prime ministers of the United Kingdom
Captains of Deal Castle
Members of the Parliament of Great Britain for English constituencies
British MPs 1774–1780
British MPs 1780–1784
British MPs 1784–1790
British MPs 1790–1796
George
Alumni of Trinity College, Oxford
Fellows of the Royal Society
Barons Guilford
Barons North